Brandon Slay (born October 14, 1975) won an Olympic gold medal for the United States in wrestling. Slay also help found Dallas Dynamite wrestling club in Dallas, TX.  Slay currently is the Assistant National Freestyle Coach and National Freestyle Resident Coach for USA wrestling, stationed at the Olympic Training Center (USOTC) in Colorado Springs.

High school years
He graduated from Tascosa High School in Amarillo, Texas, where he was a three-time State Champion in wrestling.

College years
Slay studied business at the University of Pennsylvania and received a degree from the Wharton School of Business. He wrestled all four years at Pennsylvania, where he was a two-time national runner-up and All-American in the NCAA tournament at 167 pounds. He is a member of the Alpha Tau Omega fraternity.

2000 Olympic Games in Sydney
Slay won the gold medal at the 2000 Olympic Games in Sydney, Australia after losing in the finals to Alexander Leipold of Germany. Leipold would test positive for the steroid Nandrolone, and the Gold Medal was awarded to Slay.

Personal life
Slay is a devout Christian and runs Greater Gold, which does speeches and camps about Christ and wrestling.

In 2016, Slay was inducted into the National Wrestling Hall of Fame as a Distinguished Member.

References

Sportspeople from Amarillo, Texas
Tascosa High School alumni
Living people
Olympic gold medalists for the United States in wrestling
Wrestlers at the 2000 Summer Olympics
American male sport wrestlers
1975 births
Medalists at the 2000 Summer Olympics